Aleksandr Pavlovich Petrov (sometimes: Alexandre) (14 May 1939 – 5 May 2001) was one of the first tall centers in Soviet basketball. Playing for the senior men's Soviet Union national basketball team, he won silver medals at the 1960 Summer Olympics and 1964 Summer Olympics, a bronze medal at the 1963 FIBA World Championship, as well as four EuroBasket titles, at EuroBasket 1959, EuroBasket 1961, EuroBasket 1963, and EuroBasket 1965. He was named the best center at the 1963 FIBA World Championship. After he retired from playing, he coached basketball teams in Moscow, and later in Madagascar. For his achievements, he was awarded the Order of the Badge of Honour.

References

External links
FIBA Profile

1939 births
2001 deaths
Sportspeople from Baku
Azerbaijani men's basketball players
Soviet men's basketball players
1963 FIBA World Championship players
Olympic basketball players of the Soviet Union
Basketball players at the 1960 Summer Olympics
Basketball players at the 1964 Summer Olympics
Olympic silver medalists for the Soviet Union
Olympic medalists in basketball
Centers (basketball)
Medalists at the 1964 Summer Olympics
Medalists at the 1960 Summer Olympics